Chidiock is a given name. Notable people with the name include:

Chidiock Paulet (by 1521–1574), English politician
Chidiock Tichborne ( 1562–1586), English conspirator and poet